Tyler Bryant & the Shakedown is an American rock band. Founded in Nashville, Tennessee by guitarist Tyler Bryant, the group has since released four successful studio albums, and has toured with such groups as Jeff Beck, ZZ Top, Aerosmith, AC/DC, Guns N' Roses and Lynyrd Skynyrd, as well as making appearances at several rock-themed music festivals. The group's current lineup consists of Tyler Bryant (lead guitar & vocals), Graham Whitford (rhythm guitar), Ryan Fitzgerald (bass), and Caleb Crosby (drums).

History

Formation and early years (2008–2011) 

Tyler Bryant put together his first band at the age of 15, which performed local shows in and around his hometown of Paris, Texas. In 2008, Bryant moved to Nashville to pursue a career in songwriting. It was there that he first met Caleb Crosby and Calvin Webster, a bassist. The three formed Tyler Bryant & the Shakedown, and began performing in the clubs and bars of Nashville's music scene. The group did not initially have a manager, and Bryant would contact music venues pretending to be the group's manager in order to appear more professional. Jason Stoltzfus later joined the group on rhythm guitar, but lost interest within a few months of his involvement for reasons uncertain. In March 2011, Tyler Bryant & the Shakedown released their debut EP, titled My Radio. It was also around this time that Bryant did a radio interview in New York City, where he was introduced to Graham Whitford, son of Aerosmith's Brad Whitford, as the man who would "put him out of a job". Bryant invited him to Nashville to join the Shakedown on second guitar. 

In September 2011, the group released their second EP, From the Sandcastle. The EP gained wider attention, and was featured in iTunes's "Rock on the Rise" section for eight weeks, with the song "Shackles" being featured as a discovery download. The song "Say a Prayer" was also featured in the trailer for the CBS show Vegas.

Carved, Republic, and mainstream success (2012–2016) 
Calvin Webster left the group in May 2012 and was replaced by Noah Denney. This lineup made their first (and only so far) TV appearance on Jimmy Kimmel Live! on November 9, 2012. By this point, the group had signed to Carved Records, where they released their first full-length album, Wild Child. Recorded in a 13-day period on all-analog tape at Sputnik Sound Studios in Nashville by engineer Vance Powell, the album was officially released on January 22, 2013. The record was met with great praise, being featured in Rolling Stone and Interview. Blues Rock Review gave the album a perfect score of 10/10. One track on the album, "House on Fire", was featured on the episode of the FX series of Sons of Anarchy "The Mad King", which aired on October 8, 2013.

In 2014, Tyler Bryant & the Shakedown signed with Republic Records, which had initially offered to record a full album with the group. Once the album was completed, however, Republic would not release it. According to Bryant, this was because the label did not see any commercial potential in them. Nonetheless, six out of the thirteen songs recorded for the album were re-recorded and featured on the group's EP The Wayside, which was released by the independent label John Varvatos Records on November 13, 2015. One track off the EP, "Loaded Dice & Buried Money", received a positive review from Loudwire and spent three weeks on the Billboard Mainstream Rock charts, peaking at #37. To date, it is the only instance that Tyler Bryant & the Shakedown have appeared on the Billboard charts. The group then toured with AC/DC as the opening act for the last three legs of their Rock or Bust world tour, which included a string of performances in both the United States and Europe.

Snakefarm years (2017–2020) 
After being kicked off of Republic, Tyler Bryant & the Shakedown began taking their career in a new direction. They signed to Snakefarm Records, a subsidiary of Finnish record label Spinefarm, where they released their self-titled album in November 2017. Recorded and produced by the band at Tyler’s home studio, The Bombay Palace, and mixed by John Fields, it was the first full album to be released by Tyler Bryant & the Shakedown since 2013's Wild Child. Classic Rock praised the album, claiming that "there's plenty of life left in rock 'n' roll yet". To promote the album, a music video for the track "Backfire" was produced and released on the group's YouTube channel on February 17, 2018. During this time, the group performed as an opening act for Guns & Roses during their long-running Not in This Lifetime... Tour.

The group's third full album, Truth and Lies, was released on June 28, 2019. The album was recorded in a two-week period between January and February of 2019 at Studio G in Brooklyn and was produced by Joel Hamilton. Various music videos were produced to promote the album, with videos produced for the tracks "Shock & Awe", "Ride", and "Out There". In addition, a live music video for the tracks "Drive Me Mad", "Ride", and "Eye to Eye" was produced by Fender. Truth and Lies received a positive review from UDiscover Music, who claimed the album showed that "Rock is Alive and Well". 

On March 26, 2020, it was announced that Noah Denney had left the group. Afterward, Tyler Bryant & the Shakedown began work on their fourth album, Pressure. Due to the COVID-19 pandemic, the album was recorded mostly at Bryant's home, though it featured guest musicians such as Bryant's wife Rebecca Lovell of Larkin Poe, as well as Blackberry Smoke member Charlie Starr. Ryan Fitzgerald, who had joined the group on bass following Denney's departure, recorded with the group for the album, but did not participate in any promotional material for the album leading up to its release, with his addition to the group not being revealed until the album's release on October 16, 2020.

Independent releases (2021–present) 
Following the release of Pressure, Tyler Bryant & the Shakedown ended their association with Spinefarm. Their first independently-released single, "Born Rockin'", was released on September 17, 2021. This was followed up with the CD-exclusive release of the all-acoustic EP Rust 'N' Roll on September 23.

On August 12, 2022, the group announced the completion of their fifth studio album, Shake the Roots, to be released on September 9. The album is to be released under the group's new independent label, Rattle Shake Records. That same day, the group released their first single off the album, "Ain't None Watered Down", marking a shift to a purely blues rock sound.

Discography

Studio albums

Extended plays

Band members

Current members 
 Tyler Bryant - guitar, lead vocals (2009–present)
 Caleb Crosby - drums (2009–present)
 Graham Whiftord - guitar, backing vocals (2010–present)
 Ryan Fitzgerald - bass, backing vocals (2020–present)

Past members 

 Jason Stoltzfus - guitar (2010-2010)
Calvin Webster - bass (2009-2012)
 Noah Denney - bass (2012-2020)

Timeline

References 

American blues rock musical groups
Hard rock musical groups from Tennessee
Musical groups from Nashville, Tennessee